Oru Muthassi Katha is a 1988 Indian Malayalam-language drama film directed by Priyadarshan and written by Jagadeesh. The film stars Vineeth and Nirosha, supported by Thiagarajan with K. B. Ganesh Kumar , M. G. Soman, Innocent and Lizy playing other important roles.
The filim was failure at the box office.

Plot 
The story is set in a fisherman village in the western coast of Kerala. The story revolves around the antagonist Chemparundu who is responsible for many murders in the village. Karthu, the daughter of Chemparundu falls for Chanthu, an orphan. As the story progresses, Unnikrishnan, a young man with mysterious intentions arrives at the village for fishing business.

Cast 
Vineeth as  Chanthu
Nirosha as  Karthu
Thiagarajan as Chemparundu Machan
K. B. Ganesh Kumar as  Unnikrishnan
M. G. Soman as Mayinkutty
Sukumaran as  Rajasekharan
Jalaja as Parvathi
Innocent as Thampuran
Lizy  as Thresia
Maniyanpilla Raju as Abdu
Jagadish as Thankappan
Jagathy Sreekumar as Chellayyan
Thikkurissy Sukumaran Nair as Uppooppa
Sukumari as Akkan
Kuthiravattam Pappu as Koyammedikka
Bobby Kottarakkara as Varghese
Jose as Bapputty
Santhosh as Karuppayyan
Jayalalita as Valli
V. K. Pavithran 
Philomina as Unnili, Guest Appearance in Song "Nalla Muthassiyamma"

Soundtrack

The music has been provided by Ouseppachan for the lyrics written by Shibu Chakravarthy.

Trivia

This is one of the rare Malayalam films of Priyadarshan without his friend and actor Mohanlal.
Film maker V. K. Pavithran appeared in a cameo for Oru Muthassi Katha
Malayalam script writer and actor Sreenivasan dubbed for Thiagarajan

References

External links
 

1991 films
1990s Malayalam-language films
Films directed by Priyadarshan
Films scored by Ouseppachan